Losing Louis  a play by Simon Mendes da Costa, is a black comedy which first premiered at the Hampstead Theatre, London, on 24 January 2005. It was produced by Michael Codron and starred Alison Steadman and Lynda Bellingham and was directed by Robin Lefevre. Following Hampstead Theatre it transferred immediately to the West End before embarking on a No 1. Southern tour the following year. It also opened on Broadway at the Biltmore Theatre on 12 October 2006, in a different production called Losing Louie, directed by Jerry Zaks.
  
Secrets that refuse to remain buried erupt as family members are brought together, after years of segregation to face it all out in the bedroom - the place where all the confusion began. (Taken from the original promotion leaflet)

Characters

The 1950s

 Louis Judah Ellis, A married man,
 Bobbie Ellis, His wife,
 Bella Holland, his mistress.

Present Day

 Tony Ellis,  Louis's eldest son,
 Reggie Ellis, Louis's youngest son,
 Shelia Ellis, Tony's wife,
 Elizabeth Ellis, Reggie's wife.

Notable productions

References

External links 
 Trafalgar Studio's Promotion Website
 

2005 plays